Queer Tango (or Tango Queer) is to dance Argentine tango without regard to the traditional heteronormative roles of the dancers, and often to exchange the leader and follower roles. Therefore, it is related to open role or same-sex tango. The queer tango movement permits not only an access to tango for the LBGTQIAA+ community, but also supports female leaders and male followers, regardless of sexual orientation.

Gender roles in the traditional Argentine tango
Conventional tango is said to be the stronghold of heterosexism and machismo:

Dancing in very close embrace – this intimacy is what defines tango as a "three-minute love affair"  -, the male dance partner is the lead and the female dance partner is the follow. These two gender roles are sexually defined:

Traditional tango is steeped in machismo culture. It is a reflection of Argentine (as well as other dominant Western cultures') societal views on sexuality and gender relations. In traditional tango, the man is the active participant while the woman is merely passive. The male leader moves forward, guides the step pattern, the tempo and protects the female follower who steps backwards in complete trust, her eyes might be closed. She adds expressive elements to the dance: adornos (embellishments). The man is the choreographer, however, and it is he who creates the structure of the dance. The woman's role is relegated to waiting for the man to guide her movement.

At conventional milongas it’s the man who invites the woman to dance with eye-contact and a nod of the head, called cabeceo.

Gender neutral dancing: open role reverse and same-sex tango
Queer Tango was not approved at first, due to the blurred lines of gender roles and social class rankings being affected. The Queer Tango movement breaks these rigid heteronormative gender roles of the tango world and permits all the permutations of partnering within tango. Same-sex tangoing is frequent: men dance with men, women dance with women, who can lead or follow. Also men dance with women, exploring open role reverse. The term queer, commonly used as a synonym for the LBGTQIAA+ community, is used here in a larger sense. A queer tango dancer shifts the focus from sexuality to gender which allows to enhance his expressiveness by way of role exchange. Therefore, the Queer Tango scene gives not only a home to gay, lesbian, bisexual, transgender, intersex tangueras and tangueros (tango dancers), where they can feel comfortable. It creates a liberated tango environment for gender-neutral dancing, where rules and codes of traditional tango no longer restrain communication between people. By way of queer tango teaching, heterosexuals dancers can learn the open role reverse and enhance their competences in tango:

As with all types of social dance, including conventional tango, the skill level of Queer Tango varies. Dancers who engage in queer tango are interested in expression. "Bodies without organs" is a concept explored through same-sex tangoing, which allows people to experiment the dynamic presented in the technique. Living outside of the body and its organs can be a way for people to work more creatively and release ongoing stresses:We suggest that redrawing, blurring and/or smudging the boundaries of the essential(ized) body, poking holes and coming to terms with the porosity of our skin, might help us to grapple with the partial and processual becoming of our bodies-in-relation.This detaches form from function, challenges prefigured/ predetermined conceptions and understandings of body parts (including sexual elements, organs, and limbs), and opens up possibilities for thinking otherwise (and perversely) about the roles and functional boundaries being created and policed. |— Chessa Adsit-Morris, "It Takes More Than Two to (Multispecies) Tango: Queering Gender Texts in Environmental Education".The Queer Tango movement views being different as being normal. Who they are dancing with or how they are dancing is not important. Through connecting cultures and kin, Queer Tango is twisting away from negative ties with sexism and racism.

History of the Queer Tango movement

There is one story which claims that tango as a dance was born in the brothels of Buenos Aires, another relates that tango was created by men dancing tango between men on street corners at the beginning of the 20th century:

In the first decade of the 20th century, tango became famous as a couple dance (man-woman) in Paris.
There are also French and American postcards  from the first decades of the 20th century  which represent tango between women. This feminine replica of man-to-man-tango generated much less literary documentation, yet a more extensive iconography tinged with a voyeuristic accent of eroticism:

This popularity of Tango in Europe, and especially in Paris, made it an interesting couple dance (man-woman) for the upper classes in Buenos Aires, and the Tango was re-imported from Europe for their benefit. The original way to dance it in same-sex couples got lost and was forbidden. Only male-female couples were allowed to dance in public milongas.

The queer tango movement which revives the origins of tango as a same-sex couple dance is relatively recent. It was founded  in Hamburg, Germany where in 2001 the first gay-lesbian milonga was organized. In the same year the First International Queer Tango Argentina Festival was brought to life. Since 2001 it takes place every year in order to bring together same sex couples in tango from all over the world.
Born in Germany, the Queer Tango movement inspired other countries to create local queer tango scenes. Meanwhile, Queer Tango festivals are celebrated for example in  Argentina, Montevideo, in Denmark,  Sweden, Paris, and in the United States.

In the bastion of traditional heteronormative tango, Augusto Balizano opened the first queer milonga, La Marshall, in Buenos Aires in 2002. A few years later, in 2005 Mariana Docampo started a weekly milonga in San Telmo called Tango Queer.

Queer Tango in Buenos Aires
While queer tango is more and more common in the milongas in Buenos Aires, discrimination persists against same-sex couples or couples who reverse the traditional sex-assigned roles.  In late March 2022, a new milonga housed in a famous tango institution posted a list of rules at its entrance.  Among those rules was a strict prohibition on same-sex couples dancing together.

Members of the queer tango community continue to combat this type of discrimination.  The Feminist Movement of Tango (Movimiento Feminista de Tango) maintains a social media presence to disseminate information, raise consciousness, and engage in activism.

Founded by Anahí Carballo in 2015, Tango Entre Mujeres (TEM) is the first Argentine-based all-women tango dance company.  The first scene of its 2019 work Vinculadas includes reenacted quotes of the insults that the company has received for its groundbreaking work.  Some of these include, "you [meaning women dancing with each other] are the death of tango!" and "pan con pan es comida de tontos."

See also

 Gender studies

References

Further reading
Wartluft, Elizabeth: Who’s Leading? Gender Role Transformation in the Buenos Aires Community. M.A. thesis at the University of Oregon, 2002.  excerpt on: dancingsoul.typepad.com
Guillen, Marissa E.: The Performance of Tango: Gender, Power and Role Playing. Master of Arts thesis, Ohio 2008. plain text on:  etd.ohiolink.edu.
Lugones, Maria: Milongueando Macha Homoerotics: Dancing the Tango, Torta Style (a Performative Testimonio) in US Latina and Latino Borderlands (ed. Arturo J. Aldama, et al. 2012).

External links
 Global Queer Tango information portal
 Queer Tango in San Francisco portal
 tango.info listing of queer tango festivals
Exchange of gender roles: Woman leads man – Man leads woman – Fernando Sánchez and Ariadna Naveira dancing tango in La Marshall, Buenos Aires, 2009 – (YouTube video), exchanges of embrace: 1:10,1:42,2:11,2:17 und 2:56
Queer Tango: Role Reversal – LGBT Argentine Tango: Mila Salaza and Amy Little dancing in QueerTango Café, San Francisco, (video YouTube)
Augusto Balizano and Miguel Moyano dancing tango in La Marshall, Buenos Aires, 2007 – (video YouTube)
Definitions about tango in Turkey

Tango dance
Queer theory
LGBT dance